KJBS-LP (101.1 FM) is a radio station licensed to serve Mena, Arkansas. The station is owned by the Mena Public School Board. It airs a Variety format.

The station was assigned the call letters KRMN-LP by the Federal Communications Commission on December 16, 2002. The station changed its call sign to the current KJBS-LP on February 1, 2017.

Ownership
On February 27, 2008, Rich Mountain Community College filed an application with the FCC to transfer the license for KRMN-LP to the Mena Public School Board. The college made this move as they had an application for a full-power station before the Commission and, per FCC rules, a licensee of a low-power station cannot also be the licensee of a full-power station.

References

External links
 
KJBS-LP service area per the FCC database

JBS-LP
Radio stations established in 2004
JBS-LP
Polk County, Arkansas
2004 establishments in Arkansas